Camille A. Nelson is a Canadian-Jamaican law professor and dean of the William S. Richardson School of Law at the University of Hawai’i at Manoa.

Early life and education 
Born in Jamaica, Nelson graduated with her bachelor's degree from the University of Toronto, earned her law degree from the University of Ottawa, and an LL.M. from Columbia University.

Career 
In 1994, Camille Nelson became the first black woman to clerk at the Supreme Court of Canada when she was selected by Justice Frank Iacobucci. In 2000, Nelson became Professor of Law at Saint Louis University, School of Law. Nelson served there until becoming a Visiting Professor of Law at Washington University in St. Louis School of Law. In September 2010, Nelson became the first woman and the first person of color to lead the law school when she joined Suffolk University as a Dean and Professor of Law. At Suffolk, Nelson launched the Law Practice Technology and Innovation Institute, a law technology academic concentration and programs designed to provide access to legal services for people experiencing economic hardship. Nelson visited Havana during the Cuban thaw, becoming the first American law school dean to do so since the Cuban Revolution, and facilitating discussions which enabled a class of Suffolk University Law School students to attend a course in Cuba. After Suffolk, Nelson was appointed Dean and Professor of Law at the American University Washington College of Law. During Nelson's tenure AU,"[f]or the first time, AUWCL saw three specialty programs ranked in the top five in the 2021 U.S. News Specialty Rankings – Clinical Program #2, International Law #4, and Trial Advocacy #4." in 2017, Nelson was awarded Columbia Law School's Distinguished Alumni Award for her "excellent work as a scholar, practitioner, faculty member, and speaker, and [for her] outstanding service to the legal community". Nelson is the first woman to serve as dean of the William S. Richardson School of Law at the University of Hawaiʻi at Mānoa.

Nelson is an expert on the intersection of critical race theory and cultural studies with particular emphasis on criminal law and procedure, health law, and comparative law.

References

Living people
1968 births
University of Ottawa Faculty of Law alumni
Deans of law schools in Canada
Women deans (academic)
University of Toronto alumni
Washington University in St. Louis faculty